Philippe Vigier (born February 3, 1958 in Valence, Drôme) is a French politician who has been serving as a member of the National Assembly of France since the 2007 elections, representing the Eure-et-Loir department. He is a member of the Democratic Movement. He was formerly a member of the Union of Democrats and Independents, New Centre and UDF. He is the mayor of Cloyes-sur-le-Loir, Eure-et-Loir.

In parliament, Vigier serves on the Committee on Social Affairs. He has also been a member of the Finance Committee from 2007 until 2019. In addition to his committee assignments, he is a member of the French parliamentary friendship groups with Armenia and Italy.

In 2018, Vigier was one of the founding members of the Liberties and Territories parliamentary group, until leaving the group for MoDem in 2020.

References

1958 births
Living people
People from Valence, Drôme
Politicians from Auvergne-Rhône-Alpes
Union for French Democracy politicians
Union of Democrats and Independents politicians
The Centrists politicians
Democratic Movement (France) politicians
Deputies of the 13th National Assembly of the French Fifth Republic
Deputies of the 14th National Assembly of the French Fifth Republic
Deputies of the 15th National Assembly of the French Fifth Republic
Deputies of the 16th National Assembly of the French Fifth Republic
Deputies of Eure-et-Loir
Mayors of places in Centre-Val de Loire